The Great Helmsman is a 2007 play by American playwright David Henry Hwang. It deals with two women who are debating who will be chosen for a night with Chairman Mao Zedong. The play premiered as part of the production Ten, a night of short plays. It premiered April 30, 2007 at the Joseph Papp Public Theater. It was directed by Lloyd Suh.

It is published as part of 2007: The Best Ten-Minute Plays for Three or More Actors by Smith and Kraus.

References

Plays by David Henry Hwang
2007 plays
Plays set in China
Plays based on real people